Spring Fever is a 2009 Chinese/French film directed by Lou Ye. The production of the film is in defiance of a five-year ban on filmmaking imposed by China's State Administration of Radio, Film, and Television (SARFT) for his previous film, Summer Palace.  Filmed in Nanjing, the film was described to be about a young threesome overcome with erotic longings.

By the time of the film's premiere at the Cannes Festival on 13 May 2009, it was known that Lou had circumvented the five-year ban imposed upon him after Summer Palace by having Spring Fever registered as a Hong Kong/French co-production.

Plot
The story begins in Nanjing. Suspecting that her husband Wang Ping is cheating on her, Lin Xue hires an unemployed photographer named Luo Haitao to follow him. Indeed, Wang is having a steamy affair with Jiang Cheng, a gay man. Lin confronts Wang and storms into Jiang's office to make a scene. Jiang cuts off all contact with Wang. Jiang becomes depressed and sleeps with Luo. Luo actually has a girlfriend, Li Jing, who loves him.

Wang becomes desperate and commits suicide. Meanwhile, Li's factory is shut down by the police. As her boss has been good to her, Li helps to secure his release from detention, but comes to the realization he just wants to get into her pants.

Jiang is devastated after hearing Wang's suicide. He quits his job and plans to go to Suqian with Luo for some materials. However, Li tags along and discovers their relationship. She is very upset,  but as she really loves Luo, decides to "share" him with Jiang.

On their way back to Nanjing, it becomes clear the dysfunctional love triangle cannot be sustained. Li leaves first, and Luo and Jiang also break up with some tears shed. Jiang is ambushed by a vengeful Lin and almost killed. He recovers and begins a relationship with another gay man.

Cast
Qin Hao as Jiang Cheng	
Chen Sicheng as Luo Haitao
Tan Zhuo as Li Jing
Wu Wei as Wang Ping
Jiang Jiaqi as Lin Xue
Huang Xuan

Release 
In April 2009, it was announced that Spring Fever was to be shown in competition at the 2009 Cannes Film Festival. Little else was known about the film at the time, except that Lou was in the process of editing the film in Paris.  Like Summer Palace, Spring Fever was also screened without government approval.

Reception 
An early review by industry watcher Variety, following Spring Fever's premiere in the 2009 Cannes Film Festival, was critical of the film's "overlong" running-length of 116 minutes, and its overly "Euro tastes (and Western sensibilities)," especially when compared with Lou's breakout film Suzhou River.

The film won the award for Best Screenplay at the 2009 Cannes Film Festival for its writer Mei Feng.

References

External links 
  
 
 
 Spring Fever at Cannes Film Festival
 Spring Fever at the Chinese Movie Database
 
 Spring Fever at Metacritic
 

2009 films
2009 romantic drama films
Chinese LGBT-related films
Films directed by Lou Ye
Films shot in Jiangsu
Films set in Jiangsu
French romantic drama films
Hong Kong romantic drama films
LGBT-related romantic drama films
2000s Mandarin-language films
Chinese romantic drama films
Male bisexuality in film
2009 LGBT-related films
2000s French films